Agnes Blake Poor ( – ) was an American author and translator.  She wrote under her own name and the pen name Dorothy Prescott.  She is thought to be the first American to translate Brazilian poetry from Portuguese into English.

She was the daughter of financial analyst Henry Varnum Poor and Mary Wild Pierce, daughter of Reverend John Pierce, minister of the First Church of Brookline, Massachusetts. She lived most of her life in Brookline.

She published short fiction in various magazines under the name Dorothy Prescott.  One story in The Century called "A Little Fool" (October 1896) caused an uproar because of comments made by the title character directed at South Boston that were thought to be derogatory.

Poor compiled and translated a selection of Spanish and Portuguese poems from South America, published as Pan American Poems (1918).  It was the only selection of Portuguese translations available in the early 20th century.  Poor, who taught Portuguese, included works by Antônio Gonçalves Dias (1823-1864), Bruno Seabra (1837-1876), and Francisco Manuel de Nascimento (1734-1819), though the latter had not been to Brazil.

Agnes Blake Poor died on 28 February 1922 in Brookline.

Bibliography 

 Andover memorials (1883)
 Brothers and strangers (1893)
 Boston neighbors in town and out (1898)
 Under guiding stars (1905) 
 My four great grandmothers (1918)
 Pan American Poems (1918)

References 

  

Created via preloaddraft
1842 births
1922 deaths